S.O.S. is the debut album released by the R&B band the S.O.S. Band on the Tabu label in the summer of 1980. It was produced by Sigidi Abdullah.

The album was a hit at nightclubs and "Take Your Time (Do It Right)" became a disco classic.

History
The album peaked at No. 2 on the R&B albums chart. It also reached No. 12 on the Billboard 200. The album yielded the Billboard R&B number-one hit "Take Your Time (Do It Right)" which also peaked at No. 3 on the Billboard Hot 100, No. 1 on the Hot Dance Club Play chart, and No. 51 on the UK Singles Chart. Two following singles, "S.O.S. (Dit Dit Dit Dash Dash Dash Dit Dit Dit)" and "What's Wrong with Our Love Affair?", also charted on the R&B chart, reaching numbers 20 and 87 respectively. The album was digitally remastered and reissued on CD with bonus tracks in 2013 by Demon Music Group.

Track listing

Personnel
The S.O.S. Band
Jason "T.C." Bryant – keyboards, vocals
Billy "B.E." Ellis – saxophone, keyboards, vocals
Mary Davis – vocals, background vocals, percussion
James Earl Jones III – drums, vocals
Willie "Sonny" Killebrew – saxophone, flute, vocals
Bruno Speight – lead guitar
John Alexander Simpson – bass, vocals

Additional Personnel
James Stroud – drums (on "Love Won't Wait for Love")
 Darryl "Munyungo" Jackson – percussion
Maceo Parker, Fred Wesley, Larry Hatcher, David Li, Richard Griffith, Ray Brown, Jr., Nolan Smith, Jeff Clayton – horns
Bill Henderson (concertmaster) – strings 
Rosalind Sweeper, Freddi Rawls, Michele Morgan, Gertha Simms – background vocals
Dorothy Farrell, Linda Riley, Pam Jones, Isaac Welcome, Angela (Neicy) Hall, Grace Anderson, Charlene Few – handclaps

Production
Sigidi – producer, arranger
Clarence Avant – executive producer
Fred Wesley, The S.O.S. Band – arrangers
Richard Wells, Ted Bush, Tom Race, George Pappas – engineers
Tommy Cooper, Greg Webster – assistant engineers 
David Hassinger, Serge Reyes, Rhonghea Southern – mixers
Neil Petinov – assistant mixer
Mike Reese – mastering

Charts

Singles

References

External links
 S.O.S. at Discogs

1980 debut albums
Tabu Records albums
The S.O.S. Band albums